Estadio Olímpico Tsáchila is a multi-use stadium in Santo Domingo, Ecuador. It is currently used mostly for football matches and is the home stadium of ESPOLI of the Ecuadorian Serie B. The stadium holds 10,172 spectators

External links
Stadium information
http://www.ecuafutbol.org/web/asociacion_detalle.php?cod=2390003261001

Olimpico Etho Vega
C.D. ESPOLI
Santo Domingo de los Tsáchilas Province